Grégoire Maret (born May 13, 1975) is a jazz harmonica player.

Background
Maret studied at Conservatoire de Musique de Genève, then The New School in New York City. On March 13, 2012 Maret released his first album as a leader. He has worked with Steve Coleman, Kurt Elling, Pat Metheny, Andy Milne, Meshell Ndegeocello, David Sanborn, Jacky Terrasson, and Cassandra Wilson. In 2003 he was the subject of Swiss filmmaker Frédéric Baillif's documentary Sideman.

Discography

As leader or co-leader

As sideman or guest

References 

1975 births
Living people
Musicians from Geneva
Swiss jazz musicians
Pat Metheny Group members
Jazz harmonica players